Wageman may refer to:

 Thomas Charles Wageman (1787–1863) British artist
 The Wagiman, also spelt Wageman, an Aboriginal Australian people
 Wagiman language,  also spelt Wageman, an Aboriginal Australian language

See also
 Wagemans